1980–81 in English field hockey. The principal event for men was the National Inter League Championship which brought together the winners of their respective regional leagues. The Men's championship was won by Slough

The Men's Cup was won by Slough and the Women's Cup was won by Sutton Coldfield.

Men's Truman National Inter League Championship 
(Held at Eastcote, April 25–26)

Group A

Group B

Final 

Slough
Ian Taylor, Paul Barber, Manjit Flora, Andy Churcher (Steve Partington sub), John Allen, Sutinder Singh Khehar, Brajinder Daved, Ken Partington (Bhaji Flora sub), Stuart Collins, Balwant Saini, Kuki Dhak
Westcliff
A Christmas, R Holmes, P Wakeford, R Hilton, N Havens, P Anderson, N Boddington, T Copping, M Bond, J French, Ian Towler (L Bastow sub)

Men's Cup (Rank Xerox National Clubs Championship)

Quarter-finals

Semi-finals

Final 
(Held at Guildford Hockey Club on 5 April)

Slough
Ian Taylor, Paul Barber, Manjit Flora, Andy Churcher, John Allen, Sutinder Singh Khehar, Brajinder Daved, Ken Partington, Ravinder Laly, Balwant Saini, Kuki Dhak 
Southgate
David Owen, James Duthie, Mike Spray, David Craig, A J Wallace, Alistair McGinn, M Driver, Roly Brookeman, Sean Kerly, Imtiaz Sheikh, Steve Batchelor

Women's Cup (National Clubs Championship) 
(Cheltenham Ladies' College Ground, April 11–12)

Participants 
Group 1

Group 2

Semi finals

Final

References 

1980
field hockey
field hockey
1981 in field hockey
1980 in field hockey